Veronica Vera is an American human sexuality writer and actress. She is best known for the films Times Square Comes Alive, Gerard Damiano's Consenting Adults, Mondo New York, and Rites of Passion, as well as her work with photographer Robert Mapplethorpe from 1982.

Vera is a former Wall Street trader and is also known for running the cross-dressing school Miss Vera's Finishing School For Boys Who Want to be Girls, on which she wrote a book, Miss Vera's Finishing School for Boys Who Want to Be Girls, published by Doubleday in 1997.

Miss Vera's Finishing School For Boys Who Want to be Girls

Miss Vera's Finishing School For Boys Who Want to be Girls is a business in New York City that provides instruction in cross-dressing founded and run by Veronica Vera. Actor Paul Dano attended the school while researching a role in the film The Extra Man. One of the school's most popular topics of instruction is walking in high-heeled shoes. In 2008, Vera said more than 5,000 people, including many women, had enrolled in this class in the previous 12 years.

A book version of Miss Vera's Finishing School For Boys Who Want to be Girls written by Veronica Vera was published in 1997.

References

External links
 
 
 Times Square Comes Alive scene at YouTube
 "Veronica Vera: A Consenting Adult", The Rialto Report, audio interview with Veronica Vera

Year of birth missing (living people)
Living people
American educators
American film actresses
American relationships and sexuality writers
Writers from New York (state)
American feminist writers
Bisexual feminists
Bisexual women
American LGBT writers
American LGBT rights activists
Sex worker activists in the United States
Sex-positive feminists
Sex educators
1997 books
Doubleday (publisher) books
American women non-fiction writers
American sex workers
American pornographic film actresses